Titan Aircraft is an aircraft kit manufacturer, located in Austinburg, Ohio.  They produce kits for the Titan T-51 Mustang, which is a 3/4 scale replica of the P-51 Mustang and several versions of the Tornado ultralight/light-sport aircraft.

Aircraft produced

References

External links

Titan Aircraft

Aircraft manufacturers of the United States